Night Lodgers is a 2007 documentary directed by Licínio Azevedo about squatters living in the former Grande Hotel Beira in Mozambique.

Festivals
 13º Festival Internacional de Documentários, Brazil (2008)
 Afrika Camera, Poland
 Africa in the Picture, The Netherlands
 DokLeipzig, Germany
 Montreal Film Festival, Canada
 Torino Film Festival, Italian

Awards
Gold Fipa at FIPA - International Festival of Audiovisual Programs, France (2008) 
 Best documentary at Festival Africa Taille XL, Belgium (2009)
 Closing film of Input Festival, South Africa

See also
Licínio Azevedo

External links
IMDb page about Night Lodgers
Article (in French) in Africultures
Article (in French) in Africiné

2007 films
2007 documentary films
Mozambican documentary films
Films set in hotels
Beira, Mozambique
Squatting in film
Films directed by Licínio Azevedo